Westland is a census-designated place located in Mount Pleasant and Chartiers Townships in Washington County in the state of Pennsylvania.  The community is located in northern Washington County along Pennsylvania Route 519 about 5 miles northwest of the community of McGovern.  As of the 2010 census the population was 167 residents.

References

Census-designated places in Washington County, Pennsylvania
Census-designated places in Pennsylvania